Gaziosmanpaşa S.K., or simply GOP, is a Turkish sports club from the Gaziosmanpaşa district of İstanbul.

League participations
 TFF Second League: 1990–98, 1999–03, 2007–09, 2011–14
 TFF Third League: 1998–99, 2003–07, 2009–11, 2014-16
 Turkish Regional Amateur League: 1965–90, 2016-

External links
Gaziosmanpaşaspor on TFF.org

Football clubs in Istanbul
1963 establishments in Turkey